Baweja Movies Pvt Ltd, is a company which was formed by Director Harry Baweja along with his wife producer Pammi Baweja. Their early productions are under SP Creations and Baweja Art Productions banner. Its first production was Trinetra.

List of films produced

List of web series Produced
Bhaukaal (2020-present) 

Hindi cinema
Film production companies based in Mumbai